The 2017–18 season was Livingston's first season back in the Scottish Championship after their promotion from League One at the end of the 2016–17 season. Livingston also competed in the Challenge Cup, League Cup and the Scottish Cup.

Summary

Season

Livingston finished as runners-up in the Scottish Championship and were promoted to the Scottish Premiership for the first time since 2006 with victory over Partick Thistle in the premiership play-offs. Livingston also reached the quarter-final of the League Cup, the second round of the Challenge Cup and the fourth round of the Scottish Cup.

Results and fixtures

Pre Season

Scottish Championship

Premiership play-off

Scottish League Cup

Group stage
Results

Group H

Knockout stage

Scottish Challenge Cup

Scottish Cup

Player statistics

|-
|colspan="12"|Players who left the club during the 2017–18 season
|-

|}

Team Statistics

League table

Division summary

Transfers

Players in

Players out

See also
List of Livingston F.C. seasons

References

Livingston
Livingston F.C. seasons